2×5 is a composition by Steve Reich written in 2008. It is scored for five musicians and pre-recorded tape, or two identical quintets on rock instruments, in total: 2 drum sets, 2 pianos, 4 electric guitars, 2 bass guitars. It is described as a "rock and roll piece".

Background
After writing the predominantly rhythmical Double Sextet, Reich was interested in writing a similar composition in a similar style for rock instruments.

Structure
2×5 is in three movements and typically lasts around 20 minutes:
Fast
Slow
Fast

Recordings
A recording of 2×5 by Bang on a Can was released on September 14, 2010 along with Reich's Pulitzer Prize-winning Double Sextet on the album Double Sextet/2×5.

Another recording of 2×5, performed by Mats Bergström, Magnus Persson, Jonas Ostholm, Johan Liljedahl, and Svante Henryson, was released in 2012 by Mats Bergström Musik. The disc also features new recordings of Reich's Electric Counterpoint and Nagoya Guitars.

A Russian recording by Anton Glushkin, Dmitry Abdurasulov, Gleb Kolyadin, Max Roudenko, Grigory Osipov and Alexander Veselov was released in May 2020.

References

External links
Reich rehearses 2x5 with Bang on a Can
Reich explains 2x5, his latest project with Bang on a Can

Compositions by Steve Reich
2008 in music
2008 compositions